p-Phenetidine (4-ethoxyaniline) is a chemical compound with the molecular formula C8H11NO.  It is one of the three isomers of phenetidine.  It is used as an intermediate in the synthesis of pharmaceutical drugs, dyes, and the sweetener dulcin.

p-Phenetidine is a metabolite of the pharmaceutical drugs bucetin and phenacetin and of the preservative ethoxyquin.  It is also used as a chemical intermediate in the manufacture of bucetin, phenacetin, and ethoxyquin.

p-Phenetidine has high renal toxicity and it is believed to be responsible for the adverse effects that led to the withdrawal of phenacetin and bucetin from pharmaceutical use.  p-Phenetidine is also a possible mutagen.

It is used in the synthesis of Phenacaine.

References

Anilines
Human drug metabolites